Denef is a surname. Notable people with the surname include:

 Jan Denef (born 1951), Belgian mathematician
 Norbert Denef (born 1949), German abuse victim